Balchander Anirudh (born 2 September 1994) is an Indian first-class cricketer who plays for Hyderabad. He made his Twenty20 debut for Hyderabad in the 2016–17 Inter State Twenty-20 Tournament on 29 January 2017.

References

External links
 

1994 births
Living people
Indian cricketers
Hyderabad cricketers
Cricketers from Chennai